Lady Chaser is a 1946 American mystery film directed by Sam Newfield and written by Fred Myton. The film stars Robert Lowery, Ann Savage, Inez Cooper, Frank Ferguson, William Haade and Ralph Dunn. The film was released on November 25, 1946, by Producers Releasing Corporation.

Plot

Cast
Robert Lowery as Peter Kane
Ann Savage as Inez Marie Polk 
Inez Cooper as Dorian Westmore
Frank Ferguson as Oliver T. Vickers
William Haade as Bill Redding
Ralph Dunn as Brady
Paul Bryar as Garry
Charles Williams as Apartment House Manager 
Garry Owen as Herman
Marie Martino as Anna Nelson

References

External links
 

1946 films
1940s English-language films
American mystery films
1946 mystery films
Producers Releasing Corporation films
Films directed by Sam Newfield
American black-and-white films
1940s American films